Air Caledonie International v Commonwealth, is a High Court of Australia case that provides guidance as to the constitutional definition of a tax.

Facts
The Commonwealth passed an amendment modifying the Migration Act 1958. The amendment imposed a fee on all persons entering Australia for immigration clearance. The implementation of such a scheme meant that airline operators would have to make payments to the Commonwealth government.

Decision
The High Court unanimously held that the fee for migration clearance was a tax. If section 55 of the Australian Constitution (which requires that legislation imposing tax deals only with imposing tax) is read literally, the effect of this decision would have invalidated the rest of the Migration Act. The Court was thus careful to invalidate only the Amending Act. The migration clearance fee was a tax because it has all the positive attributes of a tax. It was:

 compulsory;
 exacted by a public authority for public purposes enforceable by law;
 not a fee for services.

The court also provided some guidance as to the characteristics of a tax:
 a fee could be considered a tax even if it was collected by a private entity  not properly described as public
 the liability must be imposed in relation to some ascertainable criteria

The court also made a distinction between citizens and non-citizens. An Australian citizen cannot be stopped from entering Australia, so although they paid the clearance fee, no service was being rendered to them. Hence the fee paid could not have been a fee for a service.

See also 

 Constitutional basis of taxation in Australia
 Australian constitutional law

References 

 Winterton, G. et al. Australian federal constitutional law: commentary and materials, 1999. LBC Information Services, Sydney.

High Court of Australia cases
1988 in Australian law
Australian constitutional law
Taxation in the Australian Constitution cases
1988 in case law